The California League Hall of Fame is an American baseball hall of fame which honors players, managers, and executives of the California League for their accomplishments and/or contributions to the league in playing, administrative, media, or related roles. The Hall of Fame inducted its first class in 2016. As of 2019, 28 individuals have been inducted into the California League Hall of Fame.

Table key

Inductees

See also

References

External links
Official website

Hall
Minor league baseball museums and halls of fame
Minor league baseball trophies and awards
Awards established in 2016
Halls of fame in California
2016 establishments in California